Kostas "Con" Makris is a Greek Australian businessman  and the only Greek in Australia with a fortune of over US$640 million occupying the 36th place in the Business Review Weekly Rich 200 list. Makris is in the top 50 of the richest residents in Australia. Makris is the 46th richest man in Australia and among the 20 richest Greeks in the world.

Early life
He was born in Ligourio, Greece. Soon his family moved to Holargos where he grew up. Makris' early years were pretty hard, and so he began to work when he was only 12 years old. He emigrated to Australia in 1963 at the age of 16 to make money and eventually return to Greece.

Initially he worked in the foundry and later on he bought a string of fast food restaurants, then he moved to the property industry. Today he owns many shopping malls, Optus House in Adelaide and the Bonnyrigg Plaza on the outskirts of Sydney, and even in Greece.

Business
Makris made his fortune from real estate investments in Adelaide. Makris was also the former owner of his childhood Greek football club Panachaiki for a short period of time as he was interested in other business.

See also
 Makris Group

References

Living people
Australian businesspeople
Greek businesspeople
Greek emigrants to Australia
Businesspeople from Adelaide
1943 births